Blue Rock State Park is a public recreation area located  southeast of Zanesville in Muskingum County, Ohio.

History
The state's purchase of the state forest began in 1936; the dam creating Cutler Lake was finished in 1938; the state park was officially created with the advent of the Division of Parks and Recreation in 1949.

Facilities and activities
The park offers swimming, boating and fishing on Cutler Lake, camping, nature trails, picnicking facilities, and hunting in the surrounding state forest.

Gallery

References

External links

Blue Rock State Park Ohio Department of Natural Resources 
Blue Rock State Park Map Ohio Department of Natural Resources

State parks of Ohio
Protected areas of Muskingum County, Ohio
Protected areas established in 1949
1949 establishments in Ohio